This is a list of earthquakes in 1923. Only magnitude 6.0 or greater earthquakes appear on the list. Lower magnitude events are included if they have caused death, injury or damage. Events which occurred in remote areas will be excluded from the list as they wouldn't have generated significant media interest. All dates are listed according to UTC time. 1923 was a memorable year. Among the events was the great Tokyo, Japan earthquake. Other destructive earthquakes struck China, Iran, Colombia and Russia. The Kamchatka Peninsula, Russia and Japan saw very much activity this year.

Overall

By death toll 

 Note: At least 10 casualties

By magnitude 

 Note: At least 7.0 magnitude

Notable events

January

February

March

April

May

June

July

August

September

October

November

December

References

1923
 
1923